The Libicii (or Libui, Libii) were a Gallic tribe dwelling in the Camargue region during the Iron Age.

Name 
They are mentioned as Lebékioi (Λεβέκιοι) by Polybius (2nd c. BC), Libui by Livy (late 1st c. BC), Libii and Libiciorum by Pliny (1st c. AD), and as Libikō̃n (Λιβικῶν) by Ptolemy (2nd c. AD).

According to Patrizia de Bernardo Stempel, the ethnonym Libikoi could derive from an earlier *lubhikoi ('the loving ones'; from Gaulish lubi 'love') with pretonic vowel assimilation (u...i > i...i).

A homonym tribe is documented in northern Italy (see Libicii (Cisalpine Gaul)). This may be the result of migrations from southern France.

Geography 
Their territory was situated west of the Anatilii and Avatici, south of the Volcae Arecomici and Cavari. The ora Libica mentioned by Pliny refer to the western Rhône delta, that is to say the Camargue region. According to historian Guy Barruol, they were part of the Saluvian confederation.

An oppidum with Latin Rights given by Pliny as Libii was probably the name of their chief town.

References

Bibliography 

 
 
 
 

Gauls
Tribes of pre-Roman Gaul
Historical Celtic peoples